Paraburkholderia bannensis is a Gram-negative, aerobic, non-spore-forming bacterium of the genus Paraburkholderia and the family Burkholderiaceae, which was isolated from highly acidic swamps from torpedo grass (Panicum repens) in Thailand. It has the ability to neutralize acid.

References

bannensis
Bacteria described in 2011